The geography of South Sudan describes the physical features of South Sudan, a country in East Africa. South Sudan is a landlocked country and borders – clockwise – Sudan from the north, Ethiopia from the east, Kenya, Uganda and the Democratic Republic of the Congo from the south and the Central African Republic from the west.

Until July 9, 2011, it was part of Sudan, then the largest country in Africa before a referendum took place in January 2011.

Political geography

As of February 2020, South Sudan is divided into 10 states, two administrative areas, and one area with special administrative status. All together, they correspond to three historical regions of the Sudan: Bahr el Ghazal, Equatoria, and Greater Upper Nile.

Bahr el Ghazal
Western Bahr el Ghazal
Northern Bahr el Ghazal
Warrap
Lakes
Abyei (area with special administrative status)nuba mountain

Equatoria
Eastern Equatoria
Central Equatoria
Western Equatoria

Greater Upper Nile
Unity
Upper Nile
Jonglei
Pibor Administrative Area
Ruweng Administrative Area

Disputed areas 

 Abyei Area, a small region of South Sudan  bordering the Sudan. It is neared to South Sudanese states of Northern Bahr el Ghazal, Warrap, and Unity, currently has a special administrative status in South Sudan and is governed by an Abyei Area Administration. It was due to hold a referendum in 2012 on whether to join Sudan or remain part of the Republic of South Sudan, but in May the North Sudanese military seized Abyei, and it was not clear if the referendum would be held.
 Kafia Kingi, the westernmost part of South Sudan, which according to the Comprehensive Peace Agreement should have been given to South Sudan by Sudan. However, that did not happen, although South Sudanese troops were present there for several times. The area of Kafia Kingi, because it is disputed, so remote and far off, appears to be a safe haven for smugglers and criminals like the former head of the Lord Resistance Army, Joseph Kony. Most of Kafia Kingi is within Radom National Park, a Sudanese biosphere reserve, which is not far larger than Kafia Kingi itself.
 Ilemi Triangle, a small region of South Sudan in the far southeast bordering Kenya and Ethiopia and formerly disputed between Sudan and Kenya. With the South Sudanese independence from Sudan, South Sudan also took over the dispute around the Ilemi triangle. The triangle is now almost entirely considered Kenyan by Kenya – and it is a de facto control area of Kenya. The position of the South Sudanese government on the triangle is not clear.

Land boundaries
Bordering countries are (with boundary length):
 Central African Republic
 Democratic Republic of the Congo
 Ethiopia
 Kenya
 Sudan
 Uganda

Topography

The geomorphology of much of South Sudan and in particular towards the Nile-Congo watershed is made up a single large pediplain, extensive flat area made of coalesced pediments. Heights that rise above this pediplain contain laterite soils, sometimes with pisolites or ferricrete, and are remnants of an older surface. Some of the summits corresponding to the said old surface were formed by relief inversion of valleys.

Mountains
The Imatong Mountains are located in the southeast of South Sudan in the state of Eastern Equatoria, and extend into Uganda. Mount Kinyeti is the highest mountain of the range at 3,187 metres (10,456 ft), and the highest in the whole of South Sudan. The range has an equatorial climate and had dense montane forests supporting diverse wildlife. In recent years the rich ecology has been severely degraded by forest clearance and subsistence farming, leading to extensive erosion of the steep slopes.

Natural resources
South Sudan is mostly covered in tropical forest, swamps, and grassland. The White Nile passes through the country, passing by the capital city of Juba.

Half the water of the White Nile is lost in the swamps as vegetation absorbs it or animals drink it. The Sudd, the Bahr el Ghazal and the Sobat River swamps provide a significant resource for wild animals, as well as livestock.

See also

Geography of South Sudan index

References